Events from the year 1727 in Sweden

Incumbents
 Monarch – Frederick I

Events

 July - The Mauritz Vellingk affair: he is sentenced to death for contact with Russia, but the sentence is commuted. 
 - The Holstein Party is dissolved. 
 Lithographiæ Svecanæ Specimen Secundum by  Magnus Bromelius is published.

Births

 
 
 
 
 
 Ingeborg Norell, heroine

Deaths

 24 January - Magdalena Stenbock, politically active countess and salonnière  (born 1649) 
 
 
 - Johan Gabriel Sparwenfeld, linguist, diarist  (born 1655)

References

 
Years of the 18th century in Sweden
Sweden